Dora Kaiser (1892-1972) was an Austrian film actress of the silent era. Originally trained as a dancer, she began her career on stage before making her film debut in 1918. When Austria's leading film star Liane Haid left Wiener Kunstfilm, Kaiser replaced her in the company's films.

Selected filmography
 The Fool and Death (1920)
 Clothes Make the Man (1921)
 The Woman in White (1921)
 Serge Panine (1922)
 The Ragpicker of Paris (1922)
 The Uninvited Guest (1925)

References

Bibliography
 Robert Von Dassanowsky. Austrian Cinema: A History. McFarland, 2005.

External links

1892 births
1972 deaths
Austrian film actresses
Actresses from Vienna